is a Japanese actress. She won the award for best supporting actress at the 9th Yokohama Film Festival for Chōchin and at the 13th Hochi Film Award for A Chaos of Flowers, Hope and Pain and Wuthering Heights.

Filmography

Films
 Double Bed (1983)
 Tokei – Adieu l'hiver (1986)
 Chōchin (1987)
 Tsuribaka Nisshi (1988)
 A Chaos of Flowers (1988)
 Hope and Pain (1988)
 Wuthering Heights (1988)
 Aya (1990)
 Female (2005)
 Gina K (2005)
 Route 225 (2006)
 Sad Vacation (2007)
 Bloody Snake Under the Sun (2007)
 Then Summer Came (2008)
 Acacia (2009)
 Shibuya (2010)
 Chips (2012)
 My House (2012)
 It Comes (2018)
 Lost Girls & Love Hotels (2020)
 Snake Eyes (2021)
 Remember to Breathe (2022)

Television
  Ultraman 80 (1980 - 1981), Emi Jouno / Android Emi
 Tobu ga Gotoku (1990), Aikana

References

External links
 
 
 

1960 births
20th-century Japanese actresses
21st-century Japanese actresses
Living people
People from Yatsushiro, Kumamoto
Actors from Kumamoto Prefecture